Bezuprechny was one of 29 s (officially known as Project 7) built for the Soviet Navy during the late 1930s. Completed in 1939, she was assigned to the Black Sea Fleet. After the German invasion of the Soviet Union (Operation Barbarossa) in June 1941, the ship laid minefields and participated in the Siege of Odessa, ferrying men and supplies to the beleaguered city and providing naval gunfire support. Bezuprechny was damaged by German aircraft in September and was under repair for most of the rest of the year. During the Siege of Sevastopol, the ship resumed her duties in late December, only with a different destination. She was sunk by German aircraft while transporting supplies and troops on 26 June 1942 with the loss of approximately 300 crewmen and 320 passengers.

Design and description
Having decided to build the large and expensive   destroyer leaders, the Soviet Navy sought Italian assistance in designing smaller and cheaper destroyers.

Their crew numbered 197 officers and sailors in peacetime and 236 in wartime. The designers had been conservative in rating the turbines and many, but not all, of the ships handily exceeded their designed speed during their sea trials. Others fell considerably short of it. Bezuprechny reached  during her trials in 1939.

As built, the Gnevny-class ships mounted four  B-13 guns in two pairs of superfiring single mounts fore and aft of the superstructure. Anti-aircraft defense was provided by a pair of  34-K AA guns in single mounts and a pair of  21-K AA guns as well as two  DK or DShK machine guns. They carried six  torpedo tubes in two rotating triple mounts; each tube was provided with a reload. The ships could also carry a maximum of either 60 or 95 mines and 25 depth charges. The ships were equipped with two K-1 paravanes intended to destroy mines and a pair of depth-charge throwers.

Construction and service 
Built in Nikolayev's Shipyard No. 200 (named after 61 Communards) as yard number 1069, Bezuprechny was laid down on 23 August 1936, launched on 25 June 1937, and was completed on 2 October 1939. When the Germans invaded the Soviet Union on 22 June 1941, the ship was assigned to the 2nd Destroyer Division of the Black Sea Fleet. On 23–25 June Bezuprechny laid 291 defensive mines off Sevastopol. On 9 July, the 2nd Destroyer Division, including the destroyer leader , Bezuprechny and her sister ships ,  and  made an unsuccessful attempt to interdict Axis shipping near Fidonisi. On 14–17 August, Bezuprechny escorted the incomplete ships being evacuated from the shipyards at Nikolayev. She bombarded Axis positions with 52 shells from her 130 mm guns on 19 August. The destroyer helped to escort transports ferrying the 157th Rifle Division to Odessa on 16–21 September. Bezuprechny landed a company of naval infantry at Grigorievka on 22 September. Although she was not hit, splinters from numerous near misses knocked out her power and Besposhchadny had to tow her to Odessa for emergency repairs. On 28 September the destroyer  towed her to Sevastopol for temporary repairs.

Bezuprechny steamed under her own power to Poti, Georgia, on 3 November for further repairs which were completed by the end of the month. On 8 December she accidentally collided with the steamer  and the resulting hole in her hull required 10 days to repair. The ship began transporting men and supplies to Sevastopol on 23 December, in addition to fire support duties. Between 25 December and 2 January 1942, Bezuprechny fired 304 shells from her main guns and she continued these types of missions through March. The ship was refitted in May and, together with the light cruiser , bombarded Axis positions surrounding Sevastopol with 240 shells on 16 June. Bezuprechny was loaded with 320 soldiers of the 142nd Rifle Brigade, 20 tons of ammunition, 15 tons of food and 2 tons of aircraft equipment, bound for Sevastopol, when she was attacked and sunk by dive bombers from II./StG 77. Rescue efforts by the destroyer leader  were unsuccessful as she was driven off by more aerial attacks.

Citations

Sources

 

 

 

Gnevny-class destroyers
1937 ships
Ships built at Shipyard named after 61 Communards
Ships sunk by German aircraft
Destroyers sunk by aircraft
Maritime incidents in June 1942
World War II shipwrecks in the Black Sea